The Zona de Ejecucion (February 2018) (Spanish for "Elimination Zone") was a  major lucha libre event produced and scripted by Mexican Lucha Libre, or professional wrestling promotion, International Wrestling Revolution Group (IWRG). The show was held on January 7, 2018 in Arena Naucalpan, Naucalpan, State of Mexico, Mexico, IWRG's main arena. The show was the first time IWRG held the eponymous Zona de Ejecucion match, followed by a second Zona de Ejecucion in July.

The Zona de Ejecucion match was a 16-man elimination match, where a wrestler was forced to leave the match after they were pinned or forced to submit. In the end Aramís outlasted Imposible, Heddi Karaoui, Eterno, El Diablo Jr., El Hijo del Alebrije, Alas de Acero, Freelance, Rafy, Leo, Teelo, Mike, Dinamic Black, Dragón Fly, Black Dragón and Pantera I to win the match. After the match Aramis challenged Pantera I to a match for Pantera's IWRG Intercontinental Lightweight Championship. The show featured five additional matches.

Storylines

The event featured five professional wrestling matches with different wrestlers involved in pre-existing scripted feuds, plots and storylines. Wrestlers were portrayed as either heels (referred to as rudos in Mexico, those that portray the "bad guys") or faces (técnicos in Mexico, the "good guy" characters) as they followed a series of tension-building events, which culminated in a wrestling match or series of matches.

Results

References

External links 
 

2018 in professional wrestling
2018 in Mexico
IWRG Zona de Ejecucion
January 2018 events in Mexico